Michael Basinger is a former American football player in the National Football League.

Biography
Basinger was born on December 11, 1951, in Merced, California.

Career
Basinger was a member of the Green Bay Packers during the 1974 NFL season. He played at the collegiate level at the University of California, Riverside.

See also
List of Green Bay Packers players

References

People from Merced, California
Green Bay Packers players
UC Riverside Highlanders football players
University of California, Riverside alumni
1951 births
Living people
American football defensive ends
Players of American football from California